Hinduism in Israel refers to the Hindu population in Israel.

Hare Krishnas 
A group of devotees is living in Katzir-Harish. Another Vaishnava community in Israel is in Ariel. It is spearheaded by Jagadish and his wife, Jugala-Priti, and serves a growing community of devotees from Russia who immigrated to Israel to escape the severe economic oppression in the CIS. Jugala-Priti joined the ISKCON center in Tel Aviv, in 1996 guided by Gunavatar and Varshabhanavi.

Hindu festivals in Israel

Krishna Janmashtami
Hindus are able to practice freely in the country. This is notably shown by the celebrations of Krishna Janmashtami. Plays are staged revolving around stories of Krishna's childhood, besides singing and dancing. The event is accompanied with a feast of 108 dishes, a number that has come to be identified as pious by the faithful.

The organisers said they were inspired by Kumbh and started the event in Israel three years ago. Many of the visitors at the festival have been to India or are planning to visit. A number of youngsters could be seen taking Yoga classes and attending Hare Krishna lectures. Long queues were to be found outside the Indian ‘dhaba’ serving boiled rice and lentil soup. Middle aged couples, draped in Indian clothes, strolled the beach, young boys and girls drew circles on the soft sand while others surfed the morning sea.

Sai Organisation in Israel
Sai Organisation was officially established in Israel in 2001.

Sivananda Yoga Vedanta Organisation in Israel 
The center is a branch of Sivananda Yoga Vedanta Centre International, founded by Swami Vishnudevananda, a direct disciple of Sri Swami Sivananda, of Rishikesh, India.

The center opened in 1971 and since then the center has been the largest and most comprehensive school in Israel for the study and practice of classical yoga in all its branches, including:
 Practice Asanas (Yoga Postures)
 Pranayama (breathing yoga)
 Science of yogic stress management
 Yogic vegetarian diet
 Positive thinking
 And classical meditation

Centres 
Since 1971, their activities have expanded significantly and more centers are now operating in the following cities
 Jerusalem
 Pardes
 Eilat
 Tivon
Thousands of Israelis have been trained as yoga teachers on behalf of the international organization and are working and teaching throughout the country.

Sivananda Yoga Center in Tel Aviv 
The Sivananda Yoga Center in Tel Aviv is no longer a yoga studio.

The school is located in a three-story building designed for:
 Classical yoga classes for children, pregnant women, special needs and more
 Workshops and yoga courses in a variety of levels
 Workshops and meditation courses
 Positive thinking courses
 Sub-conscious tutorials and working with guided imagery
 Cooking workshops Yogi vegetarian
 With healthy stress management and relaxation.

See also 

 History of Jews in India
 Hinduism and Judaism
 Hinjew

References

External links
Jethro, the Druze, and Vedic Origins
Druze Sheikhs at Home In India

Israel
Religion in Israel
Israel